Taraqayah (also Romanized as Ţarāqayah and Ţarāqayeh; also known as Taraghiyeh and Targhiyeh) is a village in Ali Sadr Rural District, Gol Tappeh District, Kabudarahang County, Hamadan Province, Iran. At the 2006 census, its population was 672, in 131 families.

References 

Populated places in Kabudarahang County